Adam Vincent Schreiber (born June 6, 1980), better known by his stage name Qwel, is an underground rapper and author, originally from Chicago, Illinois. Qwel is co-founder of the underground rap crew Typical Cats, with fellow MCs Denizen Kane and Qwazaar, and producers / DJs Kid Knish and DJ Natural. Qwel has also released full-length collaboration projects with producers Maker, Jackson Jones, Meaty Ogre, Mike Gao, Silence and Kip Killagain. Qwel's label is Galapagos4, which he is an integral part of, along with co-founders Jeff Kuglich and fellow rapper Offwhyte.

Discography

Albums
Qwel
 If It Ain't Been in a Pawn Shop, Then It Can't Play the Blues (2001)
 The Rubber Duckie Experiment (2002)
 Caffeine Dream (2006) (with Mike Gao)
 Freezerburner (2006) (with Meaty Ogre)
 Nerdy (2007) (with Silence)
 The New Wine (2008) (with Kip Killagain)
 Visible Light (2011)

Qwel & Jackson Jones
 Rapid Eye Movements (2004)
 Dark Day (2005)
 20th Street Rich (2007)
 Sideweighs (2007)
 Jump the Gun (2009)

Qwel & Maker
 The Harvest (2004)
 So Be It (2009)
 Owl (2010)
 Rarities and Remixes (2010)
 Beautiful Raw (2013)

Typical Cats (Qwel with Denizen Kane, Qwazaar, DJ Natural & Kid Knish)
 Typical Cats (2001)
 Civil Service (2004)
 Typical Bootlegs Vol. 1 (2004)
 3 (2012)

EPs
 Peep My EP (2006)
 Saved (2007) (with Meaty Ogre)
 Occam's Razor (2013) (with Grey Sky Appeal)
 Beautiful EP (2013) (with Maker)
 Black Rain EP (2018) (with Jackson Jones)

Live albums
 Stone Soup (2005)

Singles
 "Face Value" (2001) 
 "Easy Cause It Is" (2004) (with Typical Cats)
 "Blood From The Stone" (2005) (with Jackson Jones)
 "Saved" (2006) (with Meaty Ogre)
 "Owl: The Singles" (2010) (with Maker)
 "Lunch Money" (2011) (with Maker)
 "Long Walkers" (with Maker)

Guest appearances
 Molemen - "Death Wish Banger" from Chicago City Limits, Vol. 1 (2001)
 Molemen - "Not Impressed" from Ritual of the Molemen (2001)
 DJ White Lightning - "Glass and Plastic" & "Red Meat" from White on White Crime (2001)
 Denizen Kane - "Calling Card" from Tree City Legends (2002)
 Offwhyte - "Masonry" from The Fifth Sun (2002)
 Maker - "Honestly" from Honestly (2003)
 Onry Ozzborn - "Who's Really Listening" from The Grey Area (2003)
 Meaty Ogre - "Orion's Right Shoulder" from Leo vs. Pisces (2003)
 2Mex - "Airwolf" from Knowhawk (2004)
 Mestizo - "Circle Mountain" from Life Like Movie (2004)
 Grayskul - "Anti-Glitter" from Name in Vain (2006)
 Hellsent - "Bless U" from Rainwater (2006)
 Royce - "City Heat" from Tuff Love (2006)
 El Cerebro - "Sin amor" from Simbiosis (2007)
 Mestizo - "Tolerance" from Dream State (2007)
 Nature of the Beast - "All Time Greats" from Homeland Security (2008)
 The Gigantics - "Las Vegas Swimming Pool" from Die Already (2008)
 Deeskee - "Motel Six" from Audiobiograffiti (2009)
 Qwazaar - "The Queue Who's" from Riverstyx Radio Vol. 1 (2009)
 Dark Time Sunshine - "Instructions to Numb" from Vessel (2010)
 Flight Distance - "Full Circle" from Bad Information (2011)
 Grey Sky Appeal - "Coffee and Smoke" from Hunt and Gather (2011)
 ADVENT - "Face Value Remix" from A Modern Bible (2012)
 Doze - "Early One Day" from Hell Is Hot as Hell, Boss (2014)
 Generik - "Science of Saying Something" from Raven (2014)
 Asphate - "Muad Dib" & "A Shadow's True Colors" from Closed Doors to an Open Mind (2015)
 Doze - "Wake Up" from Pay Dues Forever (2015)
 Jewels Hunter - "Annotations" & "Driftin'" from Footnotes of a Jewels Hunter (2016)
 Cas Metah - "Redemption" from Guest Room 2 (2019)

References

External links
 Qwel at Galapagos4
 Qwel on Facebook
 Qwel on Discogs
 Qwel at All Music Guide

1980 births
Living people
Rappers from Chicago
Underground rappers
20th-century American singers
21st-century American singers
21st-century American rappers